Aníbal González Álvarez-Ossorio  (10 June 1876 in Seville – 31 May 1929) was a Spanish architect who made important buildings in Seville and Madrid. He designed the Plaza de España and he was the chief architect of the Ibero-American Exposition of 1929 in Seville.

González was born in Seville. He studied in La Escuela Superior de Arquitectura (Madrid Superior Technical School of Architecture) where he graduated in 1902. At the beginning of his career his style was Art Deco, but later evolved towards regionalism.

Ibero-American Exposition of 1929
Aníbal González was appointed chief architect of the Sevilla Iberoamerican Exposition of 1929, where he worked until 1926. He designed in the Plaza de América of Maria Luisa Park, the Mudéjar Pavilion that was accomplished in 1914 (currently Museum of Arts and Traditions of Sevilla), the Palacio del Renacimiento (currently Archeological Museum of Seville) and the Real Pavilion. His most famous work for the Exposition is the Plaza de España, completed in 1929 that was the most emblematic place of this event. González combined a mix of 1920s Art Deco and 'mock Mudejar', and Neo-Mudéjar styles. The Plaza de España complex is a huge half-circle with buildings continually running around the edge accessible over the moat by numerous beautiful bridges. In the centre is a large fountain. By the walls of the Plaza are many tiled alcoves, each representing a different province of Spain.

References

External links 

1876 births
1929 deaths
20th-century Spanish architects
Architects of Roman Catholic churches
Architects from Andalusia
Spanish Revival architects
People from Seville